Hellesøy may refer to:

Places
Hellesøy, Stavanger, an island in the municipality of Stavanger in Rogaland county, Norway
Hellesøy, Kragerø, an island in the municipality of Kragerø in Vestfold og Telemark county, Norway
Hellesøy, or Hellesøyna, an island in the municipality of Øygarden in Vestland county, Norway
Hellesøy Lighthouse, or Hellisøy Lighthouse, a lighthouse in the municipality of Fedje in Vestland county, Norway

Other
Hellesøy Verft, a small shipbuilding company with a shipyard in Kvinnherad, Hordaland county, Norway